As a nickname, The Magician may refer to:

 Kenny Belaey (born 1983), Belgian mountain bike trials cyclist
 John Dodson (fighter) (born 1984), American mixed martial artist
 Antonio Esfandiari (born 1978), Iranian-born American poker player and former stage magician
 Raymond Goethals (1921-2004), Belgian football coach. 
 Jared Jordan (born 1984), American basketball player
 Ali Karimi (born 1978), Iranian coach and retired footballer
 Stanley Matthews (1915–2000), English footballer
 Chris Melling (pool player) (born 1979), British pool player
 Shaun Murphy (born 1982), English snooker player
 Jonathon Power (born 1974), Canadian squash player
 Efren Reyes (born 1954), Filipino pool player
 Fabrice Santoro (born 1972), French tennis player
 Robert Wagner (darts player) (born 1965), Norwegian darts player
 Dayne Zorko (born 1989), Australian rules footballer
 an alias of Merlyn (DC Comics), archenemy of Green Arrow

See also 

 Little Magician (disambiguation)
 El Mago (Spanish for "The Magician"), a list of people with the nickname
 Raymond Goethals (1921–2004), Belgian football coach nicknamed "le magicien" ("the magician")
 Eyal Berkovic (born 1972), Israeli soccer player nicknamed "Ha-Kosem" ("The Magician")
 The Wizard (nickname)

Lists of people by nickname
Nicknames in association football
Nicknames in sports